This is a list of National Football League (NFL) players with the most solo and combined tackles in their careers.

According to Pro-Football-Reference.com, the solo tackles are counted since , and the combined tackles since .

Players with at least 900 solo tackles

Updated through the  NFL season.

Players with at least 1,300 combined tackles

Updated through the  NFL season.

See also
 List of National Football League annual tackles leaders

References

National Football League records and achievements
National Football League lists
Lists of National Football League players